This is a list of journalists killed in Assam. Since 1987, 23 editors, correspondents and reporters were killed in Assam.

References

Assam
ass
Journalists killed
Journalists killed
Assam, killed
Killed